P.J. Flaherty's was a music venue located in Evergreen Park, Illinois. It was particularly popular in the 1980s and early 1990s hosting artists such as Gregg Allman, Bo Diddley, Foghat, Robin Trower, The Romantics, Greg Kihn Band, Blue Öyster Cult.

References

Music venues in Illinois
Evergreen Park, Illinois